Paul Bryan (born April 13, 1967) is a Grammy-winning Los Angeles-based music producer, arranger, songwriter, and bassist.

Biography

Music production and arranging
Bryan produced four albums by singer-songwriter Aimee Mann: One More Drifter in the Snow (SuperEgo Records, 2006), @#%&*! Smilers (SuperEgo Records, 2008), Charmer (SuperEgo Records, 2012) and 2017 Grammy winner Mental Illness (SuperEgo Records, 2017). He also produced Grant Lee Phillips' album Little Moon (Yep Roc Records, 2009), Amy Correia's You Go Your Way (2010), the band The Both's self-titled album on Super Ego Records featuring Ted Leo and Aimee Mann, the Glen Phillips album Swallowed By The New (2015), Jennifer Gillespie's Cure For Dreaming (2015), and tracks with Susanna Hoffs of The Bangles. He was also producer, bassist and mixer for Jeff Parker's 2015 record The New Breed and its companion piece, 2020's Suite For Max Brown.

Bryan wrote the string and woodwind arrangements for Nina Nastasia's critically acclaimed album Outlaster (Fat Cat Records, 2010).

Touring and session work
Bryan is a longtime member and bassist of Aimee Mann's touring band. He toured with Lucinda Williams in 2006 and Elvis Costello/Allen Toussaint in 2007, also appearing that same year on Jimmy Kimmel Live! as backup to singer-songwriter Nick Lowe.

Bryan toured in 2017 and 2018 as a member of jazz guitarist Jeff Parker's New Breed band and as a bassist and singer with Rufus Wainwright's All These Poses Tour in 2018 and 2019. He is also a member of Gerry Leonard's Spooky Ghost.

Bryan has recorded with artists Sam Phillips, Norah Jones, Billy Preston, Ann Peebles, Irma Thomas and Mavis Staples.

Solo work
Bryan also released a solo album of lyric driven songs Handcuff King (The Bats Is Happy Records, 2004).

Bryan's 2020 self-release Cri$el Gems is a progressive jazz album co-produced by Jeff Parker of Tortoise.

In 2021 Bryan released A Better Ghost. A collaboration with saxophonist Dustin Laurenzi of Twin Talk and drummer/composer Jeremy Cunningham. Downbeat Magazine gave the album 4 stars calling it, 'A moodily poetic and genre-bending jewel.' Mojo magazine also gave the record 4 stars calling it 'a less-is-more triumph'.

Songwriting
He frequently writes with songwriter Aimee Mann and is said to be co-authoring a musical based on Mann's 2007 concept album The Forgotten Arm.

Grammy Award
Bryan received a 2017 Grammy as producer of Aimee Mann's Mental Illness, which won for Best Folk Record.

Personal life
Bryan has been in a relationship with actress Emily Procter since 2008.  On December 8, 2010, Procter gave birth to their daughter. Philippa Frances (called "Pippa").

Discography

Solo albums
 2003: Handcuff King (The Bats Is Happy)
 2020: Cri$el Gems (self release)
 2021: Dustin Laurenzi, Jeremy Cunningham, Paul Bryan - A Better Ghost (Northern Spy)

With Aimee Mann
 2004: Live at St. Ann's Warehouse  (SuperEgo) CD, DVD - bass, acoustic guitar, backing vocals
 2005: The Forgotten Arm (V2) - bass, backing vocals
 2006: One More Drifter in the Snow (SuperEgo) - producer, bass 
 2008: Fucking Smilers (SuperEgo) - producer, bass, backing vocals, horn arrangements
 2012: Charmer (SuperEgo) - producer, bass, mellotron, backing vocals
 2017: Mental Illness (SuperEgo) - producer, arranger, conductor, bass, vocals

As producer
 1997: Carol Noonan Band - The Only Witness (Philo)
 2000: Dennis Brennan - Rule No. 1 (Esca) 
 2001: Tess Wiley - Rainy Day Assembly (Effanel Music)
 2002: Grey Eye Glances - A Little Voodoo (Sojourn Hill)
 2002: Gerry Leonard - The Light Machine (Indie)
 2004: Kenny White - Symphony in 16 Bars (Wildflower)
 2006: Aimee Mann - One More Drifter In The Snow (Super Ego)
 2008: Aimee Mann - @#%&*! Smilers (Super Ego)
 2009: Grant Lee Phillips - Little Moon (YepRoc)
 2009: Amy Correia - You Go Your Way (Indie)
 2010: Nina Nastasia - Outlaster (Fat Cat) 
 2011: Gaby Moreno - Illustrated Songs (Indie)
 2012: Aimee Mann - Charmer (Super Ego) 
 2012: Lindsay Fuller- You Anniversary (ATO)
 2012: Tanita Tikaram - Can't Go Back (Eagle Rock Entertainment)
 2014: The Both - The Both (SuperEgo)
 2016: Jeff Parker - The New Breed (International Anthem)
 2016: Jenny Gillespie - Cure for Dreaming (Narooma)
 2016  Glen Phillips Swallowed by the New (Umami Music)
 2016: Matt Mayhall - Tropes (Skirl)
 2017: Aimee Mann - Mental Illness (Super Ego)
 2020: Jeff Parker - Suite For Max Brown (International Anthem)
 2020: Jeremy Cunningham - The Weather Up There (Northern Spy)
 2020: Matt Mayhall - Fanatics (Self Release)
 2020: Josh Johnson - Freedom Exercise (Northern Spy)
 2020: Typical Sisters - Love Beam mixed by
 2021: Aimee Mann - Queens Of The Summer Hotel (Super Ego)

Also appears on
 1992: Duke Levine - Nobody's Home (Daring) - bass
 1993: Albert Washington - Step It Up and Go (Iris Musique) - bass
 1994: Duke Levine - Country Soul Guitar (Daring) - bass
 1994: Jennifer Trynin - Cockamamie (Warner Bros.) - bass
 1995: Mighty Sam McClain - Keep on Movin''' (Audioquest) - bass
 1999: Merrie Amsterburg - Season Of Rain (Zoë) - bass
 1999: Catie Curtis - A Crash Course in Roses (Rykodisc) - organ, djembe, shaker, percussion, bass
 2000: Merrie Amsterburg - Little Steps (Zoë) - bass, synthesizer, congas)
 2000: Dennis Brennan - Rule No. 1 (Esca) - vocals, piano, chamberlin, percussion, bass, organ, horn arrangements, Optigan
 2002: Dan Zanes and friends - Night Time! (Festival Five) - bass
 2004: Eugene Ruffolo - The Hardest Easy (k5Oats Music) - bass
 2005: Bettye LaVette - I've Got My Own Hell to Raise (ANTI-) - bass
 2005: Susan Tedeschi - Hope and Desire (Verve Forecast) - bass
 2005: Martha Wainwright - Martha Wainwright (Zoë) - bass, keyboards
 2006: Norah Jones - Not Too Late (Blue Note) - keyboards on track 3, "The Sun Doesn't Like You"
 2008: Kathleen Edwards - Asking for Flowers (Zoë) - bass
 2009: Sam Phillips - Don't Do Anything (Indie) - bass
 2010: Nina Nastasia - Outlaster (FatCat) - bass, string arrangements
 2014: Jessica Fichot]l - Dear Shanghai (self-released) - Chamberlin, Mellotron
 2016: Peter Wolf - A Cure for Loneliness'' (Concord) - bass on track 4,  "How Do You Know"

References

External links 
 
 
 

Living people
1967 births
Songwriters from California
Guitarists from Los Angeles
20th-century American bass guitarists